Vanessa Vanjie Mateo, sometimes known as Miss Vanjie or simply Vanjie, is the stage name of José Cancel, an American drag performer known for competing on the tenth season of RuPaul's Drag Race and placing fifth on the eleventh season of the show. In addition to competing on Drag Race, she has also appeared in many of its spin-offs, including RuPaul's Secret Celebrity Drag Race, RuPaul's Drag Race: Vegas Revue, Canada's Drag Race and RuPaul's Drag Race All Stars.

Early life 
She is of Puerto Rican descent. She started doing drag when Drag Race season three and All Stars alumna Alexis Mateo hired her as a backup dancer.

Career

RuPaul's Drag Race 

Vanessa Vanjie Mateo was announced as one of the fourteen contestants competing for the crown on the tenth season of RuPaul's Drag Race, which premiered on March 22, 2018. She was eliminated in the first episode, after lip syncing to Christina Aguilera's "Ain't No Other Man" against competitor Kalorie Karbdashian Williams, while Aguilera was the guest judge.

As she walked backwards off the stage, her parting words were "Miss Vanjie... Miss Vanjie... Miss... Vanjie", which later became an internet meme. "Miss Vanjie" was tweeted by many, including several by RuPaul, as well as Michelle Visage and Kathy Griffin. The meme was also edited into clips of various movies, TV shows, and even on dating apps, with clips appearing in The Simpsons, Pokémon, Grindr, and The Shining.

The "Miss Vanjie" catchphrase was said by Rylan Clark-Neal while commenting on the Eurovision Song Contest 2018 first semi-final broadcast during the presentation of Eleni Foureira from Cyprus; he also said it in reference to Montenegro singer Vanja Radovanović, whose name resembles Miss Vanjie's. RuPaul wore a "Vanjie" necklace during the Time 100 Gala red carpet. The catchphrase was also referenced in multiple further episodes of Drag Race season ten. A Snapchat filter of Vanessa's runway look was made available the day after the season ten reunion.

On January 24, 2019, Mateo was announced as one of the fifteen competitors of season 11 of RuPaul's Drag Race. She was in the bottom two for episodes nine and ten, and won both lip syncs against Plastique Tiara and Shuga Cain. She was eliminated by Brooke Lynn Hytes in the penultimate week in episode twelve, and placed fifth.

In Episode 5 of All Stars 5, she made a guest appearance as a "Lip Sync Assassin", where she lip-synced against Shea Couleé, but lost.

Post Drag Race 
Mateo was featured on the September 2018 issue cover of Gay Times. She appeared with Nina Bo'nina Brown for two episodes of the WOWPresents internet series "Fashion Photo RuView" on November 3 and 17, 2018, filling in for Raja and Raven. She appeared with Silky Nutmeg Ganache and Derrick Barry for an episode of the fourteenth season of Germany's Next Topmodel in 2019. On May 12, 2019, Mateo was sponsored by Chips Ahoy! for a social media post for Mother's Day, which got homophobic backlash.

She is one of the most followed queens from Drag Race, and has accumulated over 1.5 million Instagram followers as of October 2021.

Music 
Mateo released her first single, "I'm Vanjie", on June 21, 2018.

She appeared in the music video for Iggy Azalea's "Sally Walker" on March 14, 2019. She performed as a backup dancer to the song on Jimmy Kimmel Live! in April 2019. Mateo was also in the video for Azalea's "Started" with Trixie Mattel.

Filmography

Television

Music videos

Web series

Discography

Singles

Awards and nominations

References

External links 

 José Cancel on IMDb

Living people
1991 births
Hispanic and Latino American drag queens
LGBT people from Florida
People from Tampa, Florida
Puerto Rican drag queens
Vanessa Vanjie Mateo